Hotel Broadalbin is a historic hotel at 59 W. Main St. in Broadalbin, Fulton County, New York. The property was recently renovated and reopened in July 2019 as a full-service hotel. It features a restaurant, bar and lounge, and operates year round.

The historic structure is a two-part building consisting of a two-story, brick block building built in 1854, when it was built as a glove store, and clapboard clad frame block added in 1881 when it was converted into a hotel.  The brick block measures 30 feet by 90 and frame addition is 55 feet by 65 feet.  Both have gable roofs and features a two-story, hipped roof verandah added about 1881.

It was listed on the National Register of Historic Places in 2011.

References

External links

The Historical Marker Data Base entry

Hotel buildings on the National Register of Historic Places in New York (state)
Hotel buildings completed in 1854
Hotel buildings completed in 1881
Buildings and structures in Fulton County, New York
1854 establishments in New York (state)
National Register of Historic Places in Fulton County, New York